This is a list of episodes for the fifth and final season of Lou Grant.

Episodes

1981 American television seasons
1982 American television seasons
Lou Grant (TV series) seasons
Television about the internment of Japanese Americans